South Bengal (/দক্ষিণ বাংলা) is a term used for the southern parts of Bengal including Southern Bangladesh and Southern West Bengal, state in India. 

The Bangladesh part denotes the Khulna Division, Barisal Division and proposed Faridpur Division. Bay of Bengal is located at the end of southern part of Bangladesh.
Regions of Bangladesh

In Bangladesh

The population of the region is 28,981,345 (2.8 crore) as per the 2011 census.

In West Bengal, India
In India South Bengal term exclusively used for the southern part of West Bengal state like the South Bengal State Transport Corporation manage south Bengal transport section.

Demographics

The population of the region is 74,065,105 (7.4 crore) as per the 2011 census.

Cities and towns 

Major cities and towns in the South Bengal are (in alphabetical order):

Bangladesh

West Bengal

In sport 
The South Zone cricket team in Bangladesh is a first-class cricket team that represents southern Bangladesh (Khulna and Barisal) in the Bangladesh Cricket League.

See also
 North Bengal
 South Zone cricket team
 Bengal

References

Geography of Bangladesh
Geography of West Bengal
Bengal